Gratia is a commune in Teleorman County, Muntenia, Romania. It is composed of three villages: Ciurari-Deal, Drăghinești and Gratia.

References

Communes in Teleorman County
Localities in Muntenia